Dior Thomas Angus (born 18 January 1994) is an English professional footballer who plays as a forward for  club Harrogate Town.

He began his career in non-league football, playing for Solihull Moors, Leamington (on loan), Banbury United (on loan), Kidderminster Harriers, Worcester City (on loan), Daventry Town, Stratford Town and Redditch United. He earned a move to Port Vale in January 2018 after he scored 17 goals for Redditch in the first half of the 2017–18 season. From Vale he was loaned out to Tamworth, Nuneaton Borough and Barrow, before he joined Barrow on a permanent contract in May 2019. He helped Barrow to win promotion into the Football League as champions of the National League in the 2019–20 season, before moving on to Wrexham in January 2021. He was sold on to Harrogate Town in September 2022.

Career

Non-league
Angus began his career at Solihull Moors under the management of Marcus Bignot. He joined Southern League Premier Division side Leamington on loan during 2011–12 pre-season, and scored twice on his first-team debut in a 4–1 victory over Highgate United in the opening round of the Birmingham Senior Cup on 27 September. However he featured just twice more and failed to break into the starting eleven. He went on join Southern League Premier Division rivals Banbury United on loan, scoring four goals from 21 appearances. He made his debut for Solihull on 13 October 2012, in 2–0 win over Guiseley at Damson Park. He scored his first goal for the Moors on 20 November, in a 2–2 draw at Boston United. He went on to score seven goals from 33 appearances throughout the 2012–13 campaign.

On 17 June 2013, Angus signed a one-year contract with Conference Premier club Kidderminster Harriers. He was loaned out to Worcester City of the Conference North, but was sent back to Aggborough on 25 November after refusing to play for Worcester in the FA Trophy. He made six appearances for the "Carpetmen" before being released in January 2014. He returned to Solihull Moors, and scored one goal in 12 games in the second half of the 2013–14 season.

On 26 June 2014, Angus joined Southern League Division One Central club Daventry Town. He made ten appearances in the 2014–15 season, scoring two goals. He then moved up a division to join Stratford Town. He scored five goals from 41 appearances in the 2015–16 season. On 2 December 2016, Angus joined Redditch United, becoming manager Darren Byfield's third acquisition from Stratford Town that season. He ended the 2016–17 campaign with two goals from 23 games for the "Reds" and one goal from nine games for Stratford. He scored 17 goals from 23 appearances in the first half of the 2017–18 season.

Port Vale
On 1 January 2018, Angus signed an 18-month contract with EFL League Two side Port Vale. Despite Angus not being under contract at Redditch, Port Vale offered the club a pre-season friendly and some loan signings in compensation. Manager Neil Aspin said there was no pressure Angus to make an instant impact at Vale Park. He made his first-team debut on 6 January, coming on as a 75th-minute substitute for Marcus Harness in a 1–0 defeat at Forest Green Rovers. On 22 March, he joined National League North side Tamworth on loan until the end of the 2017–18 season. He scored three goals in six games for the "Lambs", though his loan spell at The Lamb Ground was cut short after Tamworth's relegation was confirmed. He returned to Port Vale and scored his first goal from his first start in the English Football League on 28 April, in a 2–1 home defeat to Carlisle United. After the game Aspin said that "I really hope that he can produce it at this level [League Two], but there is no pressure on him".

On 19 July 2018, he joined National League North side Nuneaton Borough on loan, along with "Valiants" teammate Mike Calveley. He returned to Port Vale on 3 January after having scored 13 goals for 25 appearances in the first half of the 2018–19 season despite "Boro" being rooted to the bottom of the league table. He said his time at Liberty Way meant a lot to him as his father was a former player at the club, though the club's financial crisis meant his own spell there was "interesting but enjoyable"; he noted that "I have never played in a team where we have had three different home kits from the start of the season to this point".

Barrow
On 15 January 2019, Angus joined National League side Barrow on loan until the end of the 2018–19 season. He picked up an ankle injury in March and was subsequently warned by manager Ian Evatt not to rush his recovery in the hope of returning to fitness early and proving himself worthy of a contract in the few remaining games of the season. Vale manager John Askey confirmed that he would not be offering Angus a new contract on 16 May. Four days later, Angus signed a one-year contract at Barrow, with the option for a further 12 months.

He signed a new contract in January 2020 to keep him at the club until summer 2021, with the option of an extra year. Despite undergoing a 14-game drought spell at the start of the 2019–20 season, he went on to form an effective strike partnership with Scott Quigley and the "Bluebirds" were top of the National League when the league was suspended due to the coronavirus pandemic in March 2020. Though the season was not resumed, Barrow went on to be promoted to the Football League as National League champions.

Wrexham
On 1 February 2021, Angus signed for National League side Wrexham on an 18-month contract after leaving Barrow. Injuries to Kwame Thomas and Jordan Ponticelli left Angus as the only fit striker available to manager Dean Keates in early April. Having scored six goals by the start of May, Angus said that the "Red Dragons" play-off campaign was "ours to lose". However Wrexham missed out on the play-offs after drawing with Dagenham & Redbridge on the final day of the 2020–21 season. The club took up an option to extend his contract by an additional 12 months in January 2022, with manager Phil Parkinson stating that "he's had a frustrating time through injury and illness, but with his contract now sorted early in the transfer window, we are now focused completely on getting Dior back up to speed". He featured 21 times in the 2021–22 season, though was not in the matchday squad for the play-off semi-final defeat to Grimsby Town at the Racecourse Ground or the 2022 FA Trophy Final defeat to Bromley at Wembley Stadium. He was also not named in a matchday squad in the first six games of the 2022–23 campaign.

Harrogate Town
On 1 September 2022, Angus returned to the Football League to join Harrogate Town for an undisclosed fee.

Style of play
Angus is a forward who describes his style of play as being about "goals, pace [and] work rate".

Personal life
Angus worked as an electrician and a model prior to turning professional in 2018. He is the son of Terry Angus, a defender who played for Northampton Town and Fulham.

Career statistics

Honours
Barrow
National League: 2019–20

References

1994 births
Living people
Footballers from Coventry
English footballers
Black British sportspeople
Association football forwards
Solihull Moors F.C. players
Leamington F.C. players
Banbury United F.C. players
Kidderminster Harriers F.C. players
Worcester City F.C. players
Daventry Town F.C. players
Stratford Town F.C. players
Redditch United F.C. players
Port Vale F.C. players
Tamworth F.C. players
Nuneaton Borough F.C. players
Barrow A.F.C. players
Wrexham A.F.C. players
Harrogate Town A.F.C. players
National League (English football) players
Southern Football League players
English Football League players
English electricians
English male models